Myrica arborea (sometimes Morella arborea) is a species of plant in the Myricaceae family. A non-legume Nitrogen fixer, it is endemic to Equatorial Guinea.  Its natural habitats are subtropical or tropical moist lowland forests, subtropical or tropical moist montane forests, and subtropical or tropical high-altitude grassland. It is threatened by habitat loss.

References

Flora of Equatorial Guinea
arborea
Vulnerable plants
Endemic flora of Equatorial Guinea
Taxonomy articles created by Polbot
Taxobox binomials not recognized by IUCN